Bill Roche and Imelda Roche  are Australian business persons who established Nutrimetics International (Australia) Pty Limited in 1968.

Biography
The couple met in a supermarket in 1956 and started in business selling lamps door-to-door.

In 1968 the couple bought the Australian franchise to Nutrimetics, starting with $6,000 of stock. In 1991, they acquired the worldwide interests of Nutrimetics International. The Nutrimetics Group was sold in 1997 to the Sara Lee Corporation. At the time of sale the company had a turnover of A$250 million a year.

Bill and Imelda Roche are now property developers and investors. They started their real estate investments with the purchase of a Sydney warehouse in the late 1950s. They now own residential land subdivisions, rural properties and office complexes.

Imelda Roche was Acting Chancellor of Bond University from 5 August 1999 to 25 November 1999, and served as Chancellor from 25 November 1999 to 30 May 2003. Imelda Roche was appointed an Officer of the Order of Australia for her distinguished service of a high degree to Australia or to humanity at large. She is now retired.

Roche Group has a strong presence in the Hunter region, owning several Hunter Valley landmarks, including the award-winning Hunter Valley Gardens, the live concert venue Roche Estate and  Harrigan's Irish Pub.

In 2020 controversy continues to grow around a Roche Group housing development planned at West Wallsend, NSW. For almost ten years, activists have been fighting to protect an Aboriginal women's site situated on land slated for development.  Despite both the NSW government and the Australian Federal government recognising the site's significance via legislation, Roche Group appear to be pushing ahead with plans that could see the Butterfly Cave women's cultural site desecrated or damaged.

Bill passed away on 30th June 2022 Aged 87.

Net worth 
Their net worth was estimated at 1.42 billion in the 2019 Rich List of the Australian Financial Review.

Gallery

References 

Living people
Australian businesspeople
Bond University chancellors
Year of birth missing (living people)
Australian billionaires
Roche, Imelda